Kendial Lawrence (born April 13, 1991) is a free agent Canadian football running back who was last a member of the Edmonton Eskimos of the Canadian Football League (CFL). He signed with the Dallas Cowboys as an undrafted free agent in 2013. He played college football at Missouri. Lawrence also played in the Italian Football League.

Professional career

2013 Missouri's Pro Day

Dallas Cowboys
On April 28, 2013, he signed with the Dallas Cowboys as an undrafted free agent. On August 31, 2013, he was released.

Hamilton Tiger-Cats
On September 9, 2013, he signed with the Hamilton Tiger-Cats of the Canadian Football League (CFL).

Milan Rhinos
Lawrence signed for the 2014 season with the Rhinos Milano in the Italian Football League. 
Between trips to USA for tryouts with the Kansas City Chiefs and Edmonton Eskimos,
Lawrence played in three games for the Rhinos Milano rushing for 307 yards and three touchdowns before signing with the Eskimos on June 24 of 2014.

Edmonton Eskimos
After playing football in Italy during the spring and early summer in 2014, Lawrence signed with the Edmonton Eskimos of the Canadian Football League, partway through the 2014 CFL season. After putting up a dazzling 850 yards from scrimmage in 2014 in half season, Lawrence's stats on offense slipped in 2015, while Lawrence's usage on special teams as a returner increased for the eventual Grey Cup champion Eskimos.

Saskatchewan Roughriders
Lawrence was signed by the Saskatchewan Roughriders on February 10, 2016. Lawrence played in 11 games for the Roughriders carrying the ball 37 times for 150 yards with one touchdown. He also caught 17 passes for 129 yards and was used extensively on punt and kick-off return. He was released by the club on October 1, 2016.

Hamilton Tiger-Cats 
Lawrence was added to the Hamilton Tiger-Cats practice roster on October 10, 2016. Lawrence played in two games for the Ticats in the 2016 season, catching one pass for 20 yards to go along with 209 combined return yards.

Edmonton Eskimos (II) 
Lawrence signed as a free agent with the Eskimos. However, he was released by the club on June 17 as they trimmed their roster in preparation for the regular season. Following a season-ending injury to John White the Eskimos signed Lawrence to a contract on July 6, 2017 before ending up with his own season ending injury after 2 games. Lawrence became a free agent when his contract expired in February 2018.

References

External links
Missouri bio 
Edmonton Eskimos bio
Dallas Cowboys bio

1991 births
Living people
African-American players of American football
African-American players of Canadian football
American football running backs
Canadian football running backs
Dallas Cowboys players
Edmonton Elks players
Hamilton Tiger-Cats players
People from Rockwall, Texas
Players of American football from Texas
American expatriate sportspeople in Italy
American expatriate players of American football
21st-century African-American sportspeople